Theodore Franklin Kluttz (October 4, 1848 – November 18, 1918) was a U.S. Representative from North Carolina.

Born in Salisbury, North Carolina, Kluttz attended the common schools.
He was a druggist.
He studied law.
He was admitted to the bar in 1881 and commenced practice in Salisbury, North Carolina.
He was presiding justice of the inferior court of Rowan County from 1884 to 1886, when he resigned.
He served as delegate to the Democratic National Convention in 1896.

Kluttz was elected as a Democrat to the Fifty-sixth, Fifty-seventh, and Fifty-eighth Congresses (March 4, 1899 – March 3, 1905).
He declined to be a candidate for renomination in 1904 to the Fifty-ninth Congress.
He engaged in the practice of his profession in Salisbury, North Carolina, until his death on November 18, 1918.
He was interred in Chestnut Hill Cemetery.

Sources

1848 births
1918 deaths
19th-century American judges
19th-century American politicians
Democratic Party members of the United States House of Representatives from North Carolina
North Carolina state court judges
People from Salisbury, North Carolina
Pharmacists from North Carolina